Philippe Gallart (born Béziers, 18 December 1962) is a former French rugby union footballer and coach. He played as a prop. He currently works as an architect.

Gallart played all his career at AS Béziers. He won 3 French Championships, in 1980/81, 1981/82 and 1983/83, and the Cup of France, in 1985/86. He left competition in 2000.

He had 18 caps for France, from 1990 to 1995, without ever scoring. He played at the Five Nations for 3 times, in 1992, 1994 and 1995. Gallart was also selected for the 1995 Rugby World Cup finals, playing a single game.

External links
Philippe Gallart International Statistics

1962 births
Living people
Sportspeople from Béziers
French rugby union players
French rugby union coaches
Rugby union props
France international rugby union players
AS Béziers Hérault players